This is a list of civic divisions of Augsburg, Bavaria, Germany. Augsburg is divided into two tiers of such divisions. The highest level division is called a Planungsraum, (Plural: Planungsräume, English: planning district) while the lower tier are called Stadtbezirke (Singular: Stadtbezirk, English: wards). Some Planungsräume contain only one Stadtbezirk, with which such a planning district is coterminous; other districts consist of multiple Stadtbezirke. Currently, Augsburg contains 17 Planungsräume and 42 Stadtbezirke. Population statistics are current as of January 1, 2006.

External links
 Interactive map of Augsburg civic divisions, with detailed census figures